Numidia was a Roman province on the North African coast, comprising roughly the territory of north-east Algeria.

History 
The people of the area were first identified as Numidians by Polybius around the 2nd century BC, although they were often referred to as the Nodidians.

Eastern Numidia was annexed in 46 BC to create a new Roman province, Africa Nova. Western Numidia was also annexed as part of the province  Africa Nova after the death of its last king, Arabio, in 40 BC, and subsequently the province (except of Western Numidia) was united with province Africa Vetus by Emperor Augustus in 25 BC, to create the new province Africa Proconsularis. During the brief period (30–25 BC) Juba II (son of Juba I) ruled as a client king of Numidia on the territory of former province Africa Nova. In AD 40, the western portion of Africa Proconsularis, including its legionary garrison, was placed under an imperial legatus, and in effect became a separate province of Numidia, though the legatus of Numidia remained nominally subordinate to the proconsul of Africa until AD 203.

During the second century, the province was Christianized, but in the fourth century, it adhered to the Donatist heresy, despite giving rise to men of Orthodox faith as illustrious as Saint Augustine, bishop of Hippo Regius (present Annaba).

After 193, under Septimius Severus, Numidia was officially detached from the province of Africa and constituted a province in its own right, governed by an imperial legatus pro praetore. Under Diocletian, it constituted a simple province in the tetrarchic reorganization, then was divided in two: Numidia Cirtensis, with capital at Cirta, and  Numidia Militiana ("Military Numidia"), with capital at the legionary base of Lambaesis. However, after decades, Emperor Constantine the Great reunited the two provinces in a single one, administered from Cirta, which was now renamed Constantina (modern Constantine)

In 428, the Vandals began their incursions in the African provinces. They eventually managed to create the Vandal Kingdom that lasted between 432 and 534, the year in which the Vandals fell and the African provinces was reincorporated into (Eastern) Roman domain and formed the Praetorian prefecture of Africa, half a century later the Exarchate of Africa, by the reign of Maurice (r. 582–602).

Between 696 and 708, the region was conquered again, this time by the Arab Muslims(Umayyad) and became part of Ifriqiya.

Major cities 
Numidia as the other African provinces became highly Romanized and was studded with numerous towns. The chief towns of Roman Numidia were: in the north, Cirta or modern Constantine, the capital, with its port Russicada (Modern Skikda); and Hippo Regius (near Bône), well known as the see of St. Augustine. To the south in the interior military roads led to Theveste (Tebessa) and Lambaesis (Lambessa) with extensive Roman remains, connected by military roads with Cirta and Hippo, respectively.

Lambaesis was the seat of the Legio III Augusta, and the most important strategic centre. It commanded the passes of the Aurès Mountains (Mons Aurasius), a mountain block that separated Numidia from the Gaetuli Berber tribes of the desert, and which was gradually occupied in its whole extent by the Romans under the Empire. Including these towns, there were altogether twenty that are known to have received at one time or another the title and status of Roman colonies; and in the 5th century, the Notitia Dignitatum enumerates no fewer than 123 sees whose bishops assembled at Carthage in 479.

Episcopal sees 
Ancient episcopal sees of Numidia listed in the Annuario Pontificio as titular sees:

References

Bibliography 
 Filippo Coarelli and Yvon Thébert, "Architecture funéraire et pouvoir : réflexions sur l'hellénisme numide", Mélanges de l'École française de Rome: Antiquité, Année 1988, 2,  
Nacéra Benseddik, « Jugurtha-Cirta-Lambèse-Timgad » in Dictionnaire du Monde antique, PUF, Paris 2005.
 Yann Le Bohec, L’Afrique romaine (146 avant J.-C. - 439 après J.-C.), éd. Picard, 2005 (Paris), 600 p. 
 François Décret and Mhamed Fantar, L’Afrique du Nord dans l’Antiquité. Histoire et civilisation - des Origines au Ve siècle, Paris, 1981.
 .

Numidia (Roman provinces)
Provinces of the Roman Empire